Guzmania candelabrum is a species of flowering plant in the Bromeliaceae family. It is native to Ecuador and Colombia.

References

candelabrum
Flora of Ecuador
Flora of Colombia
Plants described in 1888
Taxa named by Carl Christian Mez
Taxa named by Édouard André